Craigieburn is a township west of Umkomaas in KwaZulu-Natal, South Africa. It was created by the apartheid government in the apartheid era to segregate the Indian population.

History  
Originally a farm owned by a Mr. John Mackenzie, Craigieburn was site of the first sugar cane plantation south of Isipingo.

Geography 
Craigieburn is located on the KwaZulu-Natal South Coast and is approximately situated 53 km south-west of Durban. Administratively and Organisationally, it forms part of the eThekwini Metropolitan Municipality. It is bordered by the uMkomazi River to the north, Umkomaas to the east, Roseneath to the west.

Education 
Schools in Craigieburn include: 

 Naidoo Memorial Primary School
 Naidooville Primary School
 Umkomaas Drift Primary School
 Umkomaas Secondary School

Roads 
The R197 regional route cuts through Craigieburn and connects to Magabeni in the north and Umzinto in the south. The N2 highway is located east of the town and connects to Durban in the north and Scottburgh and Port Shepstone in the south.

Places of Worship

Churches 

 Craigieburn Methodist Church
 Ebenezer Evangelical Church

Temples 

 Cragieburn Ashram
 Umkomaas Siva Soobramoniar Temple
 Umkomaas Siva Subramanian Temple

References 

Populated places in eThekwini Metropolitan Municipality